Salā Lemi Ponifasio (born in Lano Samoa), is globally renowned for his progressive application to theatre, politicking, and engagement with indigenous, Māori and Pacific peoples. He was the Arts Foundation Laureate in 2011, and was the recipient of the Senior Pacific Artist Award in 2012, courtesy of the Creative New Zealand Arts Pasifika Awards.

Early life
Lemi was born in Lano, Samoa to Samoan catechists and moved to New Zealand when he was 15 years old. While at high school in New Zealand he started to attend a series of workshops with the Maori Matua Tohunga master artist Irirangi Tiakiawa in Rotoiti. Ponifasio was then invited by Maori performing arts leader Tama Huata to work with him as part of his Maori cultural group Takitimu Trust, performing in communities throughout New Zealand and in reservations in Canada.

Career
Lemi Ponifasio began his artistic career as an avant-garde experimental performer, staging his epic ten-year solo dance investigation Body in Crisis, primarily in non-theatrical and outdoor spaces.

His brief encounter with modern dance, butoh and classical ballet in the 1980s made him skeptical about the notion of contemporary dance and launched his search for the origin of his own dance. He started to travel the world and danced continuously.

He explored the life of the body through cosmic vision, genealogy, philosophy, architecture, chant, dance and ceremonies of indigenous communities, especially Maori, Kiribati, Kanaky people of New Caledonia, Samoa, Tonga, Tahiti and the diverse islands of the Pacific region.

After a decade of traveling, living and performing in many countries, Ponifasio returned to New Zealand. Reading Maori rights activist Eva Rickard quote "only dead fish flow with the current", he decided to call his first group performance work Fish of the Day.

Ponifasio formed MAU - the philosophical foundation and direction of his work, the name of his work, and the communities he works with. MAU is a Samoan word that means the declaration to the truth of a matter. With a group of young performers and friends, Ponifasio created Illumina as the first work of MAU performed at the Galaxy Theatre, Auckland, New Zealand 1992.

Ponifasio collaborates with people in all walks of life, working in schools, universities, in factories, villages, opera houses, castles, galleries, and stadiums. The work has included fully staged operas, theatre, dance, exhibitions, festivals and community forums. One of Ponifasio's longtime collaborators for over 25 years is lighting designer Helen Todd, and light is often mentioned in reviews of the work of MAU.

At the forefront of the international art scene, Ponifasio performs and exhibits his work worldwide including the Festival d'Avignon, BAM Brooklyn Academy of Music New York, Ruhrtriennale, Lincoln Center for the Performing Arts New York, Edinburgh International Festival, Theater der Welt, Théâtre de la Ville Paris, Onassis Cultural Centre Athens, London's Southbank Centre, Holland Festival, Carriageworks Sydney, Luminato Festival Toronto, Vienna Festival, Berliner Festspiele, Santiago a Mil Chile, the Venice Biennale and in the Pacific region.

In 2016, UNESCO invited Ponifasio to write the official message for International Dance Day.

Lemi Ponifasio's most recent works include Standing in Time (2017) a mauopera with MAU Wahine, Die Gabe Der Kinder (2017) with children and community of Hamburg, Lagimoana (2015) for the Venice Biennale 56th Visual Arts Exhibition; Apocalypsis (2015) with music of R. Murray Schafer at the Luminato Festival, Toronto; I AM: Mapuche (2015) and Ceremonia de Memorias (2016) with MAU Mapuche the indigenous people of Chile; and I AM (2014) for the 100th Anniversary of WW1, which premiered at the Avignon Festival followed by seasons at such places as the Edinburgh International Festival and the Ruhrtriennale, Germany. 

Other MAU creations include The Crimson House (2014) probing the nature of power and a world that sees all and no longer forgets; Stones in Her Mouth (2013), a mauopera with Maori women as transmitters of a life force through oratory and ancient chants; Orff's opera Prometheus for the Ruhrtriennale (2012); Le Savali: Berlin (2011) confronting the imperial City of Berlin with its own communities of immigrant families in search of belonging and constrained by threat of deportation; Birds With Skymirrors (2010) responding to the disappearing Pacific Islands, homelands to most of his performers and devastated by climate change; and Tempest: Without A Body (2008) concerning power and terror and the unlawful use of state power post 9/11.

Selected works

Year and place of world premieres by Lemi Ponifasio

 2017 Vanimonimo · Louvre Abu Dhabi, UAE					
 2017 Die Gabe Der Kinder · Theater Der Welt Hamburg, Germany 					
 2017 Standing In Time mauopera · Festspielhaus St Pölten, Austria								
 2016 Ceremonia De Memorias · Festival Santiago A Mil, Chile		
 2016 Recompose · KunstFestSpiele Herrenhausen, Hannover, Germany
 2015 Apocalypsis (opera_R Murray Schafer) · Luminato Festival, Toronto, Canada 
 2015 Lagimoana · Venice Biennale 56th Visual Arts Exhibition, Italy 			
 2015 I AM Mapuche · Festival Santiago A Mil, Chile 
 2014 I AM · Festival d’Avignon, France						
 2014 The Crimson House · New Zealand Festival, Wellington, New Zealand 	
 2013 Stones In Her Mouth mauopera · REDCAT Radar L.A. Festival, USA		
 2012 Prometheus (Prometheus by Carl Orff) · Ruhrtriennale, Duisburg, Germany				
 2011 Le Savali: Berlin · Berliner Festspiele, Berlin, Germany
 2011 Le Savali Videoinstallation ·  Berliner Festspiele, Berlin, Germany					
 2010 Birds With Skymirrors · Theater Der Welt, Essen, Germany				
 2010 Tempest: Without a Body · Sydney Festival, Sydney Australia
 2008 Fale Aitu / Phantom House · Lift London International Festival of Theatre, UK 			
 2008 I AM Tuhoe · Te Rewarewa Marae, Ruatoki, New Zealand 			
 2008 Tempest II · KunstenfestivaldesArts, Brussels, Belgium 
 2008 The Loss of Civil Liberties · KVS Royal Flemish Theatre, Belgium 
 2007 Woven Flesh : Oceania Exhibit · Prague Quadrennial, CZ 				 			
 2007 Tempest · Vienna Festival, Austria					
 2007 Moana Roa · MAU FORUM, Auckland, New Zealand			
 2006 Requiem · New Crowned Hope, 250th Mozart Anniversary Vienna, Austria  
 2006 Opus Dei · MAU FORUM, Auckland, New Zealand
 2006 Vasa · St Paul Street Gallery, Auckland, New Zealand
 2006–present Pacific Thought Symposium 
 2005–present MAUForum				 
 2003 Paradise · Venice Theatre Biennale, Italy	
 2003 Vasa : Oceania Exhibit · Prague Quadrennial, CZ
 2003 Threshold Wall : Heart of PQ · Prague Quadrennial, CZ
 2003 Haka : Heart of PQ · Prague Quadrennial, CZ
 2002 Bone Flute · Adelaide Festival, Australia 						
 2001 Land · Tjibaou Cultural Centre, New Caledonia 				
 2002 Bone Flute Ivi Ivi · Maidment Theatre, Auckland, New Zealand
 1999 Landing : New Zealand Exhibit · Prague Quadrennial, CZ
 1999 Rise · Winter Garden, Auckland, New Zealand    				
 1998 Ava · Maidment Theatre, Auckland, New Zealand    			
 1998 Light · WOMAD, Auckland, New Zealand        				
 1997 Sacred Hill · Taupo Festival, Taupo, New Zealand	     				
 1996 The Ancient Mother · MADD Gallery, Samoa
 1996 Lo’omatua · Maidment Theatre, Auckland, New Zealand
 1995 Illumina: Embracing The Darkness · Herald Theatre, Aotea Centre, Auckland New Zealand						
 1992 Illumina · Galaxy Theatre, Auckland, New Zealand 				
 1991 Fish of the Day Galaxy Theatre, Auckland, Taki Rua Theatre, Wellington, New Zealand 				
 1987–1996 Solo Work - Body in Crisis · diverse countries

References

External links
MAU official website

Living people
Samoan artists
New Zealand choreographers
People educated at St Paul's College, Auckland
Year of birth missing (living people)